The Asia Pacific Dragons, also known as APDs, is a rugby union team based in Singapore that played in the Global Rapid Rugby Showcase Series of 2019.

History
The team is owned and managed by Carinat Sports Marketing based in Hong Kong.

The team was founded in 2011 by bringing together the best players from the Pacific Islands and those with heritage in the Islands. It has subsequently focused on nurturing talent and promoting rugby. 

The team won its first match in Hong Kong against an invitational World XV to claim the inaugural Chartis Cup in 2011. The Asia Pacific Dragons successfully defended the cup against English club Saracens in 2012.

Initially, the APDs played 15-a-side rugby, then expanded to play rugby sevens and rugby tens. The team won the Hong Kong  Football Club Tens in 2012 and the Singapore Cricket Club Sevens in 2013, and competed at the World Club 10s in Singapore in 2014.

In 2019, the Asia Pacific Dragons, based in Singapore, entered a full-time professional team in the Global Rapid Rugby competition.

Personnel
Coaches for the 2019 season:
 Hale T-Pole - Head of Rugby
 Ryan Martin - Head Coach
 Lee Allan - Assistant Coach

See also

 Rugby union in Singapore

References

External links
 APDs Rugby page
 Asia Pacific Dragons at Carinat.com

Archives

Asian rugby union teams
Asia-Pacific
2011 establishments in Singapore
Rugby clubs established in 2011
Global Rapid Rugby teams
World Tens Series
Rugby union clubs disestablished in 2020
2020 disestablishments in Singapore